Lolu is a village in Viljandi Parish, Viljandi County in Estonia. The village has about 49 residents as reported from the 2011 Estonia Census, down 2.3% from 64 in the 2000 Estonia Census.

References

Villages in Viljandi County